"Is It Any Wonder?" is a 2006 song by British band Keane.

Is It Any Wonder? may also refer to:

"Is It Any Wonder?" (Joni James song), a 1953 song by Joni James
Is It Any Wonder? (film), a 1975 film
"Is It Any Wonder", a song by The Chameleons from the EP Tony Fletcher Walked on Water.... La La La La La-La La-La-La
"Is It Any Wonder?" , by The Cockroaches from their 1987 debut album: The Cockroaches
"Is It Any Wonder", a song by The Turtles from the album Wooden Head
"Is It Any Wonder", a song by Sophie Ellis-Bextor from the album Read My Lips
Is It Any Wonder? (EP)'', an EP by David Bowie released in 2020